The 1993 Western Michigan Broncos football team represented Western Michigan University in the Mid-American Conference (MAC) during the 1993 NCAA Division I-A football season.  In their seventh season under head coach Al Molde, the Broncos compiled a 7–3–1 record (6–1–1 against MAC opponents), finished in second place in the MAC, and outscored their opponents, 237 to 187.  The team played its home games at Waldo Stadium in Kalamazoo, Michigan.

The team's statistical leaders included Jay McDonagh with 1,974 passing yards, Dave Madsen with 571 rushing yards, and Andre Wallace with 599 receiving yards.

Schedule

References

Western Michigan
Western Michigan Broncos football seasons
Western Michigan Broncos football